Terry Murphy (born March 6, 1972) is a Northern Irish former professional snooker player.


Career
Murphy started playing the game on a reduced-size table his parents bought him in order to keep him off the streets of his native Derry while growing up, before he moved to The Midlands when he was a teenager. Murphy turned professional in 1991, and represented Northern Ireland at the World Cup in 1996, and also had his highest-ranking finish of a quarter-final in the 1997 Welsh Open. He reached a career high ranking of 29th in Snooker world rankings 1997/1998 and 1998/1999. He appeared in the 1998 World Championship where he lost 3–10 to Peter Ebdon. The following year he again reached the World Championship but was defeated 8–10 by John Parrott. He lost his full professional status in 2004, finishing 113rd in the rankings at a time when only the top 64 automatically retained their place on the main tour.

Performance and rankings timeline

References

External links 
Global Snooker Centre Bio

1972 births
Living people
Snooker players from Northern Ireland
Sportspeople from Derry (city)